The Argiinae are a subfamily of damselflies in the family Coenagrionidae, the pond damselflies.

Coenagrionidae